Veerachat Saturngrum (born 4 February 1957) is a Thai boxer. He competed in the men's bantamweight event at the 1976 Summer Olympics.

References

1957 births
Living people
Veerachat Saturngrum
Veerachat Saturngrum
Boxers at the 1976 Summer Olympics
Place of birth missing (living people)
Bantamweight boxers